Galeichthys is a genus of sea catfishes in the family Ariidae, the only genus in the subfamily Galeichthyinae. It includes four predominantly marine species distributed in Southern Africa and northwestern South America:
 Galeichthys ater Castelnau, 1861 (Black sea catfish)
 Galeichthys feliceps Valenciennes, 1840 (White barbel), the type species
 Galeichthys peruvianus Lütken, 1874 (Peruvian sea catfish)
 Galeichthys trowi Kulongowski, 2010

Those fish have three pairs of barbels: a pair of fleshy and cylindrical maxillary barbels and two pairs of mental barbels. The base of the adipose fin is as long as the base of the anal fin.

The name Galeichthys comes from Greek  'shark' and  'fish'.

References

Ariidae
Fauna of Ecuador
Fauna of Peru
Fauna of South Africa
Fish of Africa
Fish of South America
Venomous fish
Catfish genera
Taxa named by Achille Valenciennes
Marine fish genera